The Austria men's national under-16 basketball team is a national basketball team of Austria, administered by the Austrian Basketball Federation. It represents the country in international under-16 basketball competitions.

In 1970s, the team participated four times at the European Championship for Cadets. They won a bronze medal at the 2018 FIBA U16 European Championship Division C.

FIBA U16 European Championship participations

See also
Austria men's national basketball team
Austria men's national under-18 basketball team
Austria women's national under-16 basketball team

References

External links
Archived records of Austria team participations

Basketball in Austria
basketball
Men's national under-16 basketball teams